Debmar-Mercury is a television syndication company. A wholly-owned subsidiary of Lionsgate, it was formed from a merger of Debmar Studios and Mercury Entertainment in 2006.

History

Debmar Studios
Debmar-Mercury's history begins on October 31, 1993, when Mort Marcus founded Debmar Studios, with financial backing from The Walt Disney Company (where he had worked as senior vice president of sales at its Buena Vista Television syndication arm). Debmar signed a deal with CBS to distribute a handful of films and specials, such as My Fair Lady, Gunsmoke telefilms, the first two feature length Peanuts films (A Boy Named Charlie Brown and Snoopy, Come Home) and some Dr. Seuss/DFE animated specials.

The company was revived in the early 2000s, with its first rights picked up being that of the animated sitcom South Park for off-net syndication, in association with Mercury Entertainment. Tribune Entertainment was then attached as South Park's advertising sales agent in 2004. This was followed by the syndicated launch of Farscape, in association with Mercury Entertainment in 2004.

Debmar-Mercury
In 2005, the two companies were merged into the new studio Debmar-Mercury.

On July 12, 2006, Lions Gate Entertainment acquired Debmar-Mercury as part of its expansion into television distribution. In November 2006, the company was awarded the syndication rights to Family Feud starting in the 2007–2008 season, and industry rumors suggested that the company could also syndicate some classic Goodson-Todman shows. On January 11, 2007, 20th Television picked up ad-sales for select Debmar-Mercury series in syndication.

In April 2019, Debmar-Mercury moved its advertising sales deal to CBS Television Distribution Media Sales.

"10–90" model
Debmar-Mercury was known in the past for pioneering a unique syndication model known as the "10-90" approach, where the syndicator sells the program to a cable station for a 10-episode test run. If those 10 episodes achieve acceptable ratings, the show would be renewed for an additional 90 episodes. This allows the show to have a profitable life in off-network syndication, in which achieving 100 episodes is considered the desired number for a show to begin entering daily reruns. This unique broadcast syndication model for television was used with the TBS and OWN cable television networks for multiple sitcoms created by the multihyphenate Tyler Perry, and for multiple series with the FX cable television network, featuring the likes of actors Charlie Sheen (Anger Management), Kelsey Grammer and Martin Lawrence (Partners), and George Lopez (Saint George).

The model eventually broke down, with Saint George and Partners failing to reach the threshold for a 90-episode renewal (along with Comedy Central's 2010 series Big Lake, a co-production with Lionsgate and Funny or Die), and Anger Management quietly being de-emphasized by FX after middling scripts that went against that network's 'premium' image and accompanying low ratings, and actress Selma Blair accusing Lionsgate of maintaining a hostile workplace and departing the series. The series also performed poorly in its later run in broadcast syndication. The rise of streaming video providers such as Netflix, Hulu and Amazon Prime Video and their minimum quality standards also made the 10/90 model untenable in the long run. Tyler Perry also departed Lionsgate in 2011 for more creative freedom on his own in other arrangements with OWN and BET.

List of series
Note: Shows denoted with an asterisk (*) are distributed in conjunction with 20th Television or CBS Media Ventures for ad-sales.Aside from the Lionsgate libraries and the Revolution Studios film library, Debmar-Mercury distributes from the following:
 ALF (1986–1990) (produced by Alien Productions; Debmar-Mercury began syndicating the series in 2006) 
 South Park (syndicated by Debmar-Mercury from 2005-2010s)*
 Family Feud (1999–present) (produced by Fremantle North America and Feudin' Productions (1999–2010) and by Wanderlust Productions (2010–present); syndicated by Debmar-Mercury since 2007)*
 American Chopper (2003–2010)
 Deadliest Catch (2005–present)
 Tyler Perry's House of Payne (2006–2012) (produced by Tyler Perry Studios on TBS)*
 The Wendy Williams Show (2008–2022)*
 Trivial Pursuit: America Plays (2008–2009)*
 Tyler Perry's Meet the Browns (2009–2011) (produced by Tyler Perry Studios on TBS; co-distributed by Turner Television with ad-sales by Disney-ABC Domestic Television)
 Tosh.0 (2009–2021) on Comedy Central*
 Are We There Yet? (2010–2012) on TBS*
 The Jeremy Kyle Show (2011–2013)*
 Anger Management (2012–2014)*
 Key & Peele (2012–2015) (produced by Principato Young Entertainment, Artists First & Martel & Roberts)
 Celebrity Name Game (2014–2017) (produced by Fremantle North America, CBS Television Studios, and Entertain the Brutes)*
 BoJack Horseman (2014–2020) (produced by ShadowMachine and Boxer vs. Raptor for The Tornante Company; Debmar-Mercury began syndicating the series to Comedy Central in 2018)
 Schitt's Creek (2015–2020) (produced by ITV Studios Global Entertainment and CBC Television; Debmar-Mercury acquired American rights in 2019, and began syndicating it the following year)
 The Nick Cannon Show (2021–2022)
 Sherri (2022-Present)

See also
 Lionsgate Television

References

External links
 

Television syndication distributors
Mass media companies established in 1993
Lionsgate subsidiaries
2006 mergers and acquisitions